Laetesia asiatica is a species of sheet weaver found in Thailand. It was described by Millidge in 1995.

References

Linyphiidae
Spiders described in 1995
Invertebrates of Thailand
Spiders of Asia